Darrin Brian Madison Jr. (born 1996) is an American justice activist and politician. He is a member of the Wisconsin State Assembly, representing Wisconsin's 10th Assembly district since January 2023.

Biography
Darrin Madison Jr. was born and raised in Milwaukee, Wisconsin.  At a young age, he was introduced to activism through the "Young Scientist" program at Milwaukee's Urban Ecology Center.  At age 14, he participated in the mass protests against 2011 Wisconsin Act 10—the Budget Repair Bill which abolished collective bargaining rights for public employees.  Later that year, he joined Urban Underground, a youth-led social justice organization in Milwaukee.  Through his teenage years, he worked on social justice campaigns fighting for youth jobs, education, public safety, sexual health, and environmental justice.

He graduated from Ronald Wilson Reagan College Preparatory High School in 2015 and went on to earn his bachelor's degree from Howard University. While in Washington, D.C., he worked on political campaigns in Maryland, D.C., and Alaska. After earning his degree, he returned to Milwaukee as an AmeriCorps Public Allies volunteer, returning to the Urban Ecology Center and working with Milwaukee's Environmental Collaboration Office.

Political career
In the 2020 general election, incumbent Milwaukee County Board of Supervisors member Supreme Moore Omokunde was elected to the Wisconsin State Assembly and therefore had to vacate his county board seat.  A special election was called for the following spring election, and Madison was one of five candidates vying for the seat.  Madison came in second in the nonpartisan primary and faced Priscilla Coggs-Jones in the general election.  He ultimately fell just 12 votes short of Coggs-Jones in the April 2021 general election.

Later that year, Wisconsin State Assembly incumbent David Bowen announced he would run for Lieutenant Governor of Wisconsin rather than seek another term representing the 10th Assembly district.  Madison entered the race for the Democratic Party nomination and defeated Glendale mayor Bryan Kennedy in the primary. Madison faced no opponent in the general election in the overwhelmingly Democratic district.

Electoral history

Milwaukee County Board (2021)

| colspan="6" style="text-align:center;background-color: #e9e9e9;"| Nonpartisan Primary, February 23, 2021

| colspan="6" style="text-align:center;background-color: #e9e9e9;"| General Election, April 6, 2021

Wisconsin State Assembly (2022)

| colspan="6" style="text-align:center;background-color: #e9e9e9;"| Democratic Primary, August 9, 2022

| colspan="6" style="text-align:center;background-color: #e9e9e9;"| General Election, November 8, 2022

References

External links
 Campaign website (Archived November 4, 2022)
 
 Darrin Madison at Wisconsin Vote

1996 births
Living people
Howard University alumni
Democratic Party members of the Wisconsin State Assembly
African-American state legislators in Wisconsin
Politicians from Milwaukee
21st-century American politicians
21st-century African-American politicians